The 2001–02 New York Knicks season was the 56th season for the Knicks in the National Basketball Association (NBA). During the off-season, the Knicks acquired Shandon Anderson from the Houston Rockets and Howard Eisley from the Dallas Mavericks in a three-team trade, and signed free agent Clarence Weatherspoon. Entering the season, the Knicks were without Larry Johnson, who retired during training camp due to lingering injuries, ending his 10-year career in the NBA. After a 10–9 start to the season, head coach Jeff Van Gundy unexpectedly resigned in December, explaining he had "diminished focus", though he would return to coach the Houston Rockets in the 2003–04 season. Don Chaney took over for Van Gundy. Under Chaney, the Knicks suffered an 8-game losing streak in January and went 20–43 for the remainder of the season, as Marcus Camby missed the final 39 games due to a hip injury.

The Knicks lost six of their final seven games and finished in last place in the Atlantic Division with a 30–52 record. The Knicks missed the NBA Playoffs for the first time since 1987. Allan Houston led the team in scoring, averaging 20.4 points per game, while Latrell Sprewell finished second on the team in scoring with 19.4 points per game, and Kurt Thomas provided the Knicks with 13.9 points and 9.1 rebounds per game. In addition, Camby averaged 11.1 points and rebounds per game each in only 29 games, while Weatherspoon provided the Knicks with 8.8 points and 8.2 rebounds per game, and Mark Jackson contributed 8.4 points and 7.4 assists per game. Following the season, Camby and Jackson were both traded to the Denver Nuggets. However, Jackson was released to free agency and signed with the Utah Jazz.

For the season, the Knicks slightly redesigned their uniforms by removing the side panels from the bottom of their shorts, and taking players' jersey numbers off of the left side, and the team's primary logo off of the right side of their shorts, and moving the primary logo on the left leg of their shorts. After the 2001–02 season, the Knicks' jersey was altered to incorporate the "NYK" subway token logo on the back.

NBA Draft

Roster

Regular season

Season standings

Record vs. opponents

Player stats

Regular season

Awards & records

Transactions

References

External links
2001–02 New York Knickerbockers Statistics

New York Knicks seasons
New York Knicks
New York Knicks
New York Knick
2000s in Manhattan
Madison Square Garden